Indiscreet Corinne is a 1917 American silent comedy film directed by John Francis Dillon and starring Olive Thomas, George Chesebro and Josie Sedgwick.

Cast
 Olive Thomas as Corinne Chilvers
 George Chesebro as Nicholas Fenwick
 Joseph Bennett as Rocky Van Sandt
 Josie Sedgwick as Pansy Hartley
 Annette DeFoe as Florette
 Lillian Langdon as Mrs. Chilvers
 Tom Guise as Mr. Chilvers
 Lou Conley as Aunt Theodora
 Thornton Edwards as 'Live Wire' Dodge
 Ed Brady as P.A. Britton
 Harry L. Rattenberry as Mr. Cotter Brown
 Anna Dodge as Mrs. Cotter Brown

References

Bibliography
 Robert B. Connelly. The Silents: Silent Feature Films, 1910-36, Volume 40, Issue 2. December Press, 1998.

External links
 

1917 films
1917 comedy films
1910s English-language films
American silent feature films
Silent American comedy films
American black-and-white films
Films directed by John Francis Dillon
Triangle Film Corporation films
1910s American films